Vianania australis is a moth in the subfamily Arctiinae. It was described by Orfila in 1935. It is found in Argentina.

References

Moths described in 1935
Lithosiini